Camila Martins Pereira (born 10 October 1994), commonly known as Camila or Camilinha, is a Brazilian professional footballer who currently plays as a midfielder or outside back for Brazilian Série A1 team Palmeiras.

Club career

Camila debuted for Kindermann of Santa Catarina in 2012, then joined rivals Ferroviária for the 2015 Copa do Brasil.

She was signed by Houston Dash in May 2015. The Dash waived her in January 2016.

On 19 December 2016, the Orlando Pride announced that they had signed Camila for the 2017 season. On 30 September 2017 Camila suffered a torn ACL and MCL sprain in her right knee during Orlando's final regular season game in North Carolina. As a result, she missed Orlando's playoff game the following week. Camila made her first appearance of the 2018 season following recovery from injury on 7 July against the Washington Spirit.

In 2018, Camila spent the NWSL offseason on loan with Iranduba in Brazil. She played in all 5 of the team's Copa Libertadores matches as they finished third in their inaugural season in the competition.

During the 2019–20 NWSL offseason, Camila joined the Australian W-League for the first time, signing a loan deal with Canberra United. She made her debut for the team in the season opener on 17 November 2019, registering an assist in a 2–0 win over Perth Glory before being named to the W-League team of the week. Camila played in the first 10 games of Canberra's season before suffering an MCL injury in training, ruling her out for the rest of the campaign.

On August 12, 2020, Camila joined Série A1 team Palmeiras on loan. In February 2021, she joined the club permanently following the expiration of her contract with Orlando.

International career
At the 2014 FIFA U-20 Women's World Cup in Canada, Camila made three appearances for Brazil and served one assist.

Career statistics

Club

International goals
 As of match played 24 August 2017. Brazil score listed first, score column indicates score after each Camila goal.

References

External links
 
 
 Camila at NWSL
 Camila at Houston Dash

1994 births
Living people
Brazilian women's footballers
Women's association football defenders
Sportspeople from Rio Grande do Sul
Associação Ferroviária de Esportes (women) players
Houston Dash players
Expatriate women's soccer players in the United States
Expatriate women's soccer players in Australia
Brazilian expatriate sportspeople in Australia
Brazilian expatriate women's footballers
Brazilian expatriate sportspeople in the United States
National Women's Soccer League players
Orlando Pride players
Brazil women's international footballers
2019 FIFA Women's World Cup players
Canberra United FC players
Sociedade Esportiva Palmeiras (women) players
Sociedade Esportiva Kindermann players